Poul Richard Hartmann (1 May 1878 – 29 June 1969) was a Danish rowing coxswain who competed in the 1912 Summer Olympics.

He coxed the Danish boat that won the gold medal in the coxed fours, inriggers.

References

1878 births
1969 deaths
Danish male rowers
Coxswains (rowing)
Rowers at the 1912 Summer Olympics
Olympic rowers of Denmark
Olympic gold medalists for Denmark
Olympic medalists in rowing
Medalists at the 1912 Summer Olympics